Cuthbert Marshall (fl. 1536) was Archdeacon of Nottingham during the reign of Henry VIII of England.

References

Year of birth missing
Year of death missing
Archdeacons of Nottingham
16th-century English clergy